Mount Ng'iro is a mountain in the north of Kenya overlooking the Suguta Valley, part of the Great Rift Valley, to the west.
The mountain is surrounded by desert, but is forested on its upper slopes.
It lies in the territory of the Samburu people. Some subclans under the Lmasula phratry  cultivate bees on the mountain, and as bee-keepers claim exclusive rights to the land and water.

See also
 List of Ultras of Africa

References

Sources

Great Rift Valley
Ngiro